Kathleen Moore (born ; died 1899), also known as Catherine Moore, Kathleen A. Moore, Kathleen Andre Moore, Kate Moore, and Catherine A. Moore, was a lighthouse keeper.  She was employed by the United States Lighthouse Service, which was a precursor agency to the United States Coast Guard.

Moore served at the Black Rock Harbor Light on Fayerweather Island in Long Island Sound for over half a century, beginning when she helped her father as a twelve-year-old.  She is credited with saving 23 lives.

According to Moore: "Sometimes there were more than two hundred sailing vessels at night, and some nights there were as many as three or four wrecks." Moore's duties included keeping the light lit during stormy weather, and nursing shipwrecked sailors back to health. She retired in 1878. She died in 1899 and was buried in an unmarked grave at Mountain Grove Cemetery in Bridgeport.

Recognition

In 2010, the Coast Guard decided that all the new Sentinel-class cutters would be named after Coast Guard personnel who were recognized for heroism. Built at Bollinger Shipyards, the cutter is homeported in Key West, Florida. Bollinger delivered the vessel to the Coast Guard for pre-commissioning testing on March 28, 2014.

A grave marker was dedicated to Moore at Mountain Grove Cemetery in 2014, shortly before the commissioning of the ship in her name. The gravestone, provided by Bollinger Shipyards, quotes John 8:12 and lists her name as "Kathleen A. Moore" and her birth year as "circa 1812".

References

1812 births
1899 deaths
United States Lighthouse Service personnel
Women lighthouse keepers
Female United States Coast Guard personnel
19th-century American women
Burials at Mountain Grove Cemetery, Bridgeport
People from Bridgeport, Connecticut